Warren County Fire Tower is a historic fire tower located near Liberia, Warren County, North Carolina.  It was built in 1932, by the Aermotor Company of Chicago, Illinois.  The tower is a four sided
truss steel frame with bolted connections that stands 100 feet tall.  It is the only fire tower in Warren County and was operated until 1993.

It was listed on the National Register of Historic Places in 2000.

References 

Fire lookout towers in North Carolina
Fire lookout towers on the National Register of Historic Places
Buildings and structures on the National Register of Historic Places in North Carolina
Buildings and structures completed in 1932
Buildings and structures in Warren County, North Carolina
National Register of Historic Places in Warren County, North Carolina